Davide Dallospedale (born 12 September 1977) is an Italian baseball player who competed in the 2000 Summer Olympics and in the 2004 Summer Olympics. He also played in the 2006 World Baseball Classic and the 2009 World Baseball Classic.

References

1977 births
Living people
Olympic baseball players of Italy
Baseball players at the 2000 Summer Olympics
Baseball players at the 2004 Summer Olympics
Fortitudo Baseball Bologna players
Grosseto Baseball Club players
Parma Baseball Club players